Mubarakpur is a town in the Jacobabad District in Sindh Province  of Pakistan.Near Mian Sahib and Thul in Sindh Province Of Pakistan .It is located at 28° 10' 8.4972'' N68° 38' 18.2148E with an altitude of 47 metres its original name (with diacritics) is Shāhal .

See also
Thul
Shikarpur, Sindh

References 

Towns in Pakistan
Populated places in Jacobabad District